Maulen Sagatkhanovich Ashimbayev (born 28 January 1971) is a Kazakh politician serving as Chair and member of the Senate of Kazakhstan. He served as the First Deputy Head of the Presidential Administration from 2019 to 2020, Assistant to the President of Kazakhstan in 2019, First Deputy Chairman of Nur Otan from 2018 to 2019 and member of the Mazhilis from 2016 to 2018.

Biography

Early life and education 
Born in Alma-Ata in 1971, Ashimbayev graduated from the Al-Farabi Kazakh National University with a degree in economics and was a professor in Political Economy. 
In 2001, he earned a candidate in Political Sciences with his thesis “Political Transit in Kazakhstan in the Context of Global Democratization Processes”. In 2003, Ashimbayev studied at the Paul H. Nitze School of Advanced International Studies of the Johns Hopkins University in Baltimore, where he earned a scientific internship. From 2015 to 2016, he attended the Fletcher School of Law and Diplomacy of the Tufts University in Medford, Massachusetts, earning a master's degree in international relations.

Political career 
From 1993 to 1994, Ashimbayev worked in the system of the Ministry of Press and Mass Media. In 1994, he became the Assistant to the Deputy of the Supreme Council
From June to November 1995, Ashimbayev was the consultant to the Apparatus of the Security Council. From 1995 to 1999, he was a senior expert, sector manager, first deputy head of the Center for Analysis and Strategic Studies of the Presidential Administration of Kazakhstan. In 1999, Ashimbayev became the Head of the Analytical Center of the Security Council of Kazakhstan. In 2002, he became the director of the Kazakhstan Institute for Strategic Studies under the President of Kazakhstan.

In May 2005, Ashimbayev was deputy secretary of the Security Council. In 13 April 2006, he became the deputy head of the Presidential Administration of Kazakhstan.

In the 2012 Kazakh legislative election, Ashimbayev was elected as the member of the Mazhilis as chairman of the Committee on International Affairs, Defense and Security. He was reelected again in 2016 and served as the chairman of the Committee on Foreign Affairs, Defense and Security.

On 4 May 2020, Ashimbayev was appointed by President Kassym-Jomart Tokayev to succeed Dariga Nazarbayeva as the Chair of the Senate of Kazakhstan and was unanimously confirmed by the Senate.

On 26 January 2023, Ashimbayev was re-elected as Chair of the Senate of Kazakhstan, by secret ballot. His candidacy for re-appointment was proposed by President Tokayev.

References 

Nur Otan politicians
Members of the Mazhilis
Chairmen of the Senate of Kazakhstan
1971 births
Living people
Al-Farabi Kazakh National University alumni
The Fletcher School at Tufts University alumni
Paul H. Nitze School of Advanced International Studies alumni
People from Almaty